Halldóra Briem (13 February 1913, Vestmannaeyjar - 21 October 1993, Stockholm) was the first Icelandic woman to study architecture. She studied architecture at the KTH Royal Institute of Technology in Stockholm, Sweden from 1935 to 1940. She would go on to work professionally in Sweden.

References

Icelandic women architects
20th-century Icelandic people
Icelandic architects
1913 births
1993 deaths